The 1976–77 Mexican Primera División was the 35th season of the Mexican Primera División, Mexico's premier football competition. It began on 8 September 1976 and concluded on 3 July 1977.

Overview

San Luis was promoted to Primera División.

This season was contested by 20 teams, and UNAM won the championship.

Zacatepec was relegated to Segunda División.

After this season Tampico Madero acquired the San Luis franchise.

Teams

Stadiums and locations

Group stage

Group 1

Group 2

Group 3

Group 4

Results

Relegation play-offs

Overview

|}

Matches

UANL won 4–3 on aggregate and remained in Primera División; Zacatepec were relegated to Segunda División.

Final stage

Group A

Group B

Final

Overview
The first leg was played on 29 June, and the second leg was played on 3 July 1977.

|}

Matches

UNAM won 1–0 on aggregate.

References

Liga MX seasons
Mex
1976–77 in Mexican football
p

External links
Mexico 1976/77 at RSSSF.com